Party is a 1984 Hindi-language film directed by Govind Nihalani. The film boasted an ensemble cast of leading art cinema actors of Parallel Cinema, including Vijaya Mehta, Manohar Singh, Om Puri, Naseeruddin Shah, and Rohini Hattangadi. It based on the play Party (1976) by Mahesh Elkunchwar.

The movie was produced by National Film Development Corporation of India (NFDC). Party was the official Indian entry to the 32nd International Film Festival of India, New Delhi, and also took part in the Tokyo Film Festival 1985 and Asia Pacific Film Festival 1985.

Overview

Shot in real-time, lasting most of an evening, except for a few initial scenes to set the context — which show the people invited to the party, just before the party, getting ready, looking forward to going or cribbing about having to go — and a harrowing finale.

The film is a deeply intelligent satire aimed at the urban elite — especially those poseurs with artistic inclinations, namely establishment-artists and their patrons. It depicts their apathy towards the society at large while they get away, by the way of small talk and prosaic conversations at parties.

The power of the movie derives from Elkunchwar's play — which had a very successful run in Marathi theatres in Pune and Bombay, before Govind Nihalani turned it, with the author's active participation, into a screenplay.

Nihalani had just made Ardh-Satya — which had been a surprise break-away hit for alternative cinema (or Parallel Cinema as it is called in India) and it was easier for him to get generous financing from the government public sector company NFDC (later declared bankrupt and closed soon after the assassination of art movie aficionado Prime Minister Rajiv Gandhi).

There is some speculation that it was not being offered a role in this movie, and two others, which so disillusioned art house diva Smita Patil that she switched to doing mainstream Bollywood movies.

Plot and technique

The entire action is confined to an evening party hosted by Damyanti Rane (Vijaya Mehta), a rich middle-age widow and well-known patron of the arts in the city. All the cognoscenti of the urban milieu make a beeline to the event.

The party is hosted in the honour of Diwakar Barve (Manohar Singh), a celebrated playwright, who has just been awarded the prestigious National Literary Award. There are gradual revelations in conversations between attendees of the party — by turns catty, outraged, resigned and cynical — that he got the award because he is Damyanti's lover, who wields political clout, or a toady of the establishment.

Gradually, all the conversation gears towards the real winner, the hero-in-absentia: Amrit, an immensely talented and promising writer-poet who left the politics of the party circuit and literary societies to go live and work with the tribal community.

Amrit, though not present in person, shows himself again and again in their conversations reminding them and viewers of their banality, deceit, and their utter callousness towards the inequities in society at large, which brings them at cross-purposes to the true aim of all art and artistic endeavours: the ennoblement of humanity.

In a harrowing finale, which cuts to the heartland of the country, Amrit is shown to be murdered by the police as a "left-wing terrorist" approximately at the same time as the party was going on.

Awards

 1985 National Film Award for Best Supporting Actress: Rohini Hattangadi
 1985 Asia-Pacific Film Festival, Best Actress: Vijaya Mehta

Cast
Manohar Singh - Diwakar Barve
Vijaya Mehta - Damayanti Rane
Rohini Hattangadi - Mohini, Diwakar's Lover
Om Puri - Avinash, Journalist
Naseeruddin Shah - Amrit
Deepa Sahi - Sona Rane
Amrish Puri - Damayanti's Partner
Shafi Inamdar
Gulan Kripalani - Vrinda
Ila Arun - Ila
Soni Razdan - Malvika (Vicky)
Mohan Bhandari - Vicky's husband
Jayant Kripalani
K.K. Raina - Bharat
Kanvaljeet
Pearl Padamsee - Ruth
Nikhil Kapur
Savita Prabhune
Benjamin Gilani - Sahani
Akash Khurana
Ravi Jhankal

References

External links

A study of the film Party

1984 films
1980s Hindi-language films
Indian films based on plays
Films featuring a Best Supporting Actress National Film Award-winning performance
Films directed by Govind Nihalani